Oru Swakaryam is a 1983 Indian Malayalam-language film, directed by Harikumar and produced by Vindhyan. The film stars Venu Nagavally, Jalaja, Mammootty and Jagathy Sreekumar. The film has musical score by M. B. Sreenivasan.

Cast
Venu Nagavally as Chandran
Jalaja as Uma
Mammootty as Usmanikka/Sayippu
Jagathy Sreekumar as Boss
Nedumudi Venu as Shivankuttty
Bharath Gopi as Kaimal
Thodupuzha Vasanthi as Vasanthy 
Nithya Ravindran as Kanakam 
Babu Namboothiri as Press Manager
Sreenivasan as Murali
Sukumari as Chandran's mother
Thilakan as Chandran's father
Ramachandran as Sethu

Soundtrack
The music was composed by M. B. Sreenivasan with lyrics by M. D. Rajendran, Vayalar Ramavarma and Sugathakumari.

References

External links
 

1983 films
1980s Malayalam-language films